The name Danas has been used to name four tropical cyclones in the northwestern Pacific Ocean. The name was contributed by the Philippines and is an Austronesian verb meaning "to experience" or "to feel".
 Typhoon Danas (2001) (T0115, 19W) – struck Japan.
 Severe Tropical Storm Danas (2007) (T0710, 11W) – high waves injured two people in Japan
 Typhoon Danas (2013) (T1324, 23W, Ramil) – Category 4 typhoon, which struck the Ryukyu Islands and Japan
 Tropical Storm Danas (2019) (T1905, 06W, Falcon)

Pacific typhoon set index articles